Leslie Marie Graves (September 29, 1959 – August 23, 1995) was an American actress.

Early years
Leslie Graves's father, Michael Graves, was a theatre actor and introduced her to the entertainment industry when she was about 10. She started her career with a small role in the Broadway play A Cry of Players (1968–1969), written by William Gibson. She then moved to acting for TV series, including Sesame Street (1969, first 13 episodes), The Mary Tyler Moore Show (1971, in the episode titled "Baby Sit-Com"), and Here We Go Again (1973).

In the late 1970s, she left Hollywood, supposedly to move with a boyfriend to Texas, where she worked on a shrimp boat for three years.

Career
Graves's return to Hollywood in early 1980 was marked by some nude photoshoots. Phillip Dixon shot her for Oui, a Playboy corporation affiliate and put her on the cover in November 1980 and again in May 1981 with a shoot by five photographers). At that time, rumors arose about her involvement with Penthouse publisher Bob Guccione and an argument with Playboy publisher Hugh Hefner.

She had small roles in two exploitation movies: Piranha II: The Spawning (1982) and Death Wish II (1982). In 1982, CBS cast her in the role of Brenda Clegg in the daytime soap Capitol.

In late summer 1984, Graves left the CBS show due to a serious drug problem and a heroin overdose, but her departure was reported as stress-related. Her last public appearance was a nude photo shoot by Jean Rougeron published in the October 1984 issue of Oui.

Filmography

Personal life
Leslie Graves was married and had two children. On August 23, 1995, she died of an AIDS-related illness in Los Angeles.

References

External links
 

1959 births
1995 deaths
American television actresses
American soap opera actresses
AIDS-related deaths in California
Actresses from New Mexico
20th-century American actresses
People from Silver City, New Mexico